The following lists the top 25 albums of 2014  in Australia from the Australian Recording Industry Association (ARIA) end-of-year albums chart.

Ed Sheeran’s album x was the most popular album in 2014 in Australia. It spawned five top-ten singles and accrued six weeks at number one through the year, only behind INXS and their release The Very Best which held the top spot for 7 non-consecutive weeks and was the highest selling album in 2014 by an Australian artist.

Katy Perry's Prism was number 7 on the 2014 rankings, having already achieved the number 2 position in 2013. And Michael Bublé's Christmas appeared at number 8 on the 2014 chart, making it four successive years appearing in the top ten of the annual chart.

Top 25 

Note: In the Lonely Hour peaked at number 2 in 2014 and peaked at number 1 in April 2015.

See also 
 List of number-one albums of 2014 (Australia)
 List of Top 25 singles for 2014 in Australia

References

Australian record charts
2014 in Australian music
Australia Top 25 Albums